Thurmond Moore (born November 14, 1955) is an American football coach. He most recently was the defensive line coach for the New York Sentinels of the United Football League (UFL).

External links
 Tulsa Golden Hurricane bio
 TA Website

1955 births
Living people
Amsterdam Admirals coaches
Buffalo Bulls football coaches
Colorado State Rams football coaches
London Monarchs coaches
New York Sentinels coaches
North Texas Mean Green football coaches
Syracuse Orange football coaches
Tulsa Golden Hurricane football coaches
UCLA Bruins football coaches